The 1930 Curuçá River event refers to the possible fall of objects on 13 August 1930 over the area of Curuçá River in Brazil. It is based on the account of a single investigator who interviewed witnesses to the purported event and then wrote a letter to the Vatican Observatory.

Overview
The event received little attention until 1995, when British astronomer Mark E. Bailey found in the Vatican Library archives a 1931 issue of L'Osservatore Romano, which contained a dispatch from the Franciscan friar Fedele d'Alviano. D'Alviano had visited the region five days after the event and interviewed people from the region; they told him they were frightened by what had happened. According to Bailey, the Curuçá event was one of the most important impact events of the 20th century.

Inspired by Bailey's article and based on images from Landsat satellites, the Brazilian astrophysicist Ramiro de la Reza attempted to find an astrobleme—the remains of a meteorite impact crater. He explored a circular feature measuring 1 km in diameter, to the southeast of the village of Argemiro, but found no evidence for impact.

In the first week of June 1997, de la Reza led an expedition organized by Rede Globo and co-financed by ABC Television of Australia, to the region where the event is said to have occurred. Subsequent researchers have concluded that the circular feature is unrelated to the reported event, and is not an impact crater.

Assuming that the reported event was an air burst, various researchers have estimated the initial mass of the meteor at between 1,000 and 25,000 tons. Estimates for the energy released have varied from 9 kilotons, 100 kilotons, and 5 megatons, though most estimates place the energy at below 1 megaton, comparable to the Chelyabinsk meteor.

See also 
 List of meteor air bursts
 List of possible impact structures on Earth

References

Further reading 
http://alias.estadao.com.br/noticias/geral,estrondo--na-selva,1760865
 Bailey, Mark E. et al. 1995. The Observatory Vol. 115 (1128), pp. 250–253
 Daily Herald. Menace of meteors like huge bombs from space. 6 Mar 1931, p. 9.
 De la Reza, J. R.; Rumble in the Jungle, Quantum programme of the ABC-TV, Australia, directed by Richard Smith, ABC-TV Science Unit, 1998.
 Gehrels, T.,;Collisions with Comets and Asteroids. Scientific American, Vol. 274, No. 3., March, 1996, pp. 54–59. 
 Gorelli, R.; The Rio Curuçá Event. Meteorite!, August 1995, p. 26.
 Huyghe, P.; Incident at Curuça. The Sciences, March/April, 1996, pp. 14–17.
 Informazioni Fides, L'Osservatore Romano. The Fall of Three Bolides on the Amazonas. Strange and Frightening Phenomena. 1 March, p. 5, 1931. (English translation in Bailey et al. 1995.)
 Kulik, L. A.; The Brazilian twin of the Tunguska meteorite. Priroda i Ljudi, 13–14, p. 6, 1931.
 Vasilyev, N.; and Andreev, G.; The Brazilian Twin of the Tunguska Meteorite: Myth or Reality? WGN, The Journal of the International Meteor Organization, 17, No.6, pp. 247–248, 1989.
 Vega, A. J.; Possible Evidencia Sismica del Evento "Tunguska" del 13 de Agosto de 1930, Ocurrido en Brasil. Revista Geofisica Instituto Panamericano de Geografia e Historia 44, Enero-Junio, pp. 201–211, 1996.

1930
1930 in Brazil
Explosions in 1930
Meteoroids
1930 natural disasters
Natural disasters in Brazil
Explosions in Brazil
Pará
August 1930 events
1930 disasters in Brazil